The Fundamental Methodist Conference, Inc., is a body of independent Methodist congregations organized in 1942.

In 2001 there were 814 members in 13 congregations. By 2018 the conference listed five congregations, all of which are located in southwestern Missouri, with headquarters near Springfield, Missouri. The conference is a member of the American Council of Christian Churches.

It holds its annual conference at the Fundamental Methodist Conference Grounds near Ash Grove in Lawrence County, Missouri, where it hosts an active youth camp ministry. This body is a member of the American Council of Christian Churches.

The denomination publishes The Evangelical Methodist in conjunction with the likeminded Evangelical Methodist Church of America.

Background

The Fundamental Methodist Conference was instituted at Ash Grove, Missouri, in 1942 under the name Independent Fundamental Methodist Church. The title was changed to Fundamental Methodist Church, Inc., when the first annual conference was held in 1944.

The Fundamental Methodist Conference traces its origins through the Methodist Protestant Church to the Anglican reformation and evangelical awakening of the Wesley brothers, John and Charles. The three major Methodist conferences in the United States – the Methodist Episcopal Church, Methodist Episcopal Church, South, and the Methodist Protestant churches – united under the name The Methodist Church in 1939. The union was attended with dissatisfaction among certain people in all three groups. The John's Chapel Church (formerly part of the Methodist Protestant Church) of Lawrence County, Missouri, withdrew from The Methodist Church on August 27, 1942, and elected a committee to draw up a constitution and by-laws for fundamental Methodists. On August 23, 1944, the first annual conference was held in Greene County, Missouri, with three churches representing. The denomination was chartered on February 27, 1948.

Unlike most Methodists, the churches of the Fundamental Methodist Conference do not baptize infants, though dedication of children is retained. They only observe immersion for baptism. Since they do not regard baptism as initiation to the universal church, they will receive members from other churches who have been baptized by sprinkling or pouring. Government is more congregational and less connectional than generally practiced by Methodists. Each congregation owns its property and calls its pastors. The church has no bishops; the annual conference elects a District Superintendent and a Secretary-Treasurer.

References

Bibliography
Handbook of Denominations (6th ed.), by Frank S. Mead
History and Discipline of the Faith and Practice of the Fundamental Methodist Church (1980)
Minutes of the Fundamental Methodist Conference, Inc., 2001
Religious Congregations & Membership in the United States, 2000, Glenmary Research Center

External links

The American Religious Experience - Methodists
Divisions and Reunions in North American Methodism

History of Methodism in the United States
Christian organizations established in 1942
Methodist denominations established in the 20th century
Methodist denominations in North America
Fundamentalist denominations
1942 establishments in Missouri